William David Beazley (7 October 1854 – 28 June 1912) was an English Australian politician, who was a member of the Victorian Legislative Assembly for the electoral district of Collingwood from 1889 to 1904, and for Abbotsford from 1904 to 1912.

Biography
Beazley was born in London to William and Elizabeth Beazley, and arrived in Melbourne as an infant in around 1855. He worked as a saddler and harness marker, and in around 1886 was an estate agent. In March 1889, he was elected as one of two members for Collingwood in the Victorian Legislative Assembly. In 1904, the seat became a single-member electorate, and Beazley was elected for the new district of Abbotsford. In addition to his positions in the Parliament of Victoria, Beazley also served as mayor of Collingwood on two occasions during his parliamentary term, from 1894 to 1895 and from 1899 to 1901.

His appointments included Chairman of Committees from 1897 to 1903, and Speaker of the Victorian Legislative Assembly from 1903 to 1904. He also served on two royal commissions into state banking and old age pensions.

Beazley was also the Founding President of the Collingwood Football Club, and a key person involved in establishing the Club.

Beazley died in office on 28 June 1912. Gordon Webber was elected to replace him at a by-election on 26 July.

Notes

References

External links

 

|-

1854 births
1912 deaths
Members of the Victorian Legislative Assembly
Speakers of the Victorian Legislative Assembly
English emigrants to colonial Australia
Victoria (Australia) local councillors
Mayors of places in Victoria (Australia)
Collingwood Football Club administrators
Politicians from Melbourne